Dave Wittenberg, sometimes credited as Dave Lelyveld, (born September 10, 1971) is a South African-born American voice actor and scriptwriter.

Early life
Wittenberg was born in Johannesburg, South Africa. He was raised in the Los Angeles area.

Career
Wittenberg voices Kakashi Hatake in Naruto, Michael Lee in Witch Hunter Robin. Bash Johnson in Randy Cunningham: 9th Grade Ninja, Franz's singing voice in the Disney animated film Planes, Vision in Marvel Heroes, Lang Rangler in JoJo's Bizarre Adventure: Stone Ocean, and Time Baby in Gravity Falls.  In video games, he voices Trigger Happy from the Skylanders series, Mad Doctor from Epic Mickey, and Buddy Alexander from Resident Evil: Damnation.

He is also an adaptive scriptwriter for English dubs of anime whose work includes episodes of Digimon. Wittenberg also narrates many documentaries and specials for the Travel Channel and Food Network.

Filmography

Anime

Animation

Films

Video games

 .hack//INFECTION – Sora
 .hack//MUTATION – Sora
 .hack//OUTBREAK – Sora
 .hack//QUARANTINE – Sora
 Aliens versus Predator – All Narration
 Assassins Creed Revelations – Misc. Voices
 Baroque – The Coffin Man, Koriel Member no. 3 (uncredited)
 Batman: Arkham Knight – Officer Denheen, Officer Lynch, B.P.D. Officers
 Buffy the Vampire Slayer: Chaos Bleeds – Assorted Vampires
 Bulletstorm – Ratface, Creeps
 Company of Heroes – Airborne (night), Various voices
 Command & Conquer 3: Tiberium Wars – Nod Shadow Team, Nod Raider Buggy, Additional voices
 Command & Conquer 3: Kane's Wrath – Kane's assistant (live action performance), Additional Voices
 Dead Island – Bobby
 Dead Rising – Ed Deluca, James Ramsey, Sam Franklin, Additional Voices (as Dave Wittenburg)
 Diablo III – Additional Voices
 Diablo III: Reaper of Souls – Additional Voices
 Digimon Rumble Arena – Henry Wong
 Dissidia Final Fantasy – Kefka Palazzo
 Dissidia 012 Final Fantasy – Kefka Palazzo
 Disney Infinity 3.0 – Additional Voices
 Epic Mickey 2: The Power of Two – Additional Voices
 Fight Club – Additional Voices
 Final Fantasy Type-0 HD – Additional Voices
 Ghost in the Shell: Stand Alone Complex – Saito
 Generation of Chaos – Orochimaru (uncredited)
 God of War III – Civilians and Soldiers
 GUN – Soapy Jennings
 Halo 3: ODST – Mike Branley
 Kensei: Sacred Fist – Mark Galeon
 Lightning Returns: Final Fantasy XIII – Additional Voices
 Magna Carta 2 – Igton Pin
 Majin and the Forsaken Kingdom – Tepeu
 Mass Effect – Additional Voices
 Medal of Honor: Pacific Assault – Tommy Conlin
 Medal of Honor: Rising Sun – Additional Voices
 Naruto series – Kakashi Hatake
 Prinny 2: Dawn of Operation Panties, Dood! – Prinny (uncredited)
 Phantom Brave – Persimmon/Canary
 Prototype – Additional Voices
 Prototype 2 – Additional Voices 
 Rage – Various Voices
 Rave Master – Pasha
 Resident Evil 6 – Additional Voices (uncredited)
 SD Gundam Force: Showdown! – Gundiver 02, Guneagle (as David Lelyveld)
 Skylanders: Spyro's Adventure – Hektore (3DS exclusive character), Additional Voices
 Skylanders: Giants – Trigger Happy
 Skylanders: SuperChargers – Trigger Happy
 Skylanders: Swap Force – Trigger Happy
 Skylanders: Trap Team – Trigger Happy, Trigger Snappy
 SOCOM U.S. Navy SEALs: Fireteam Bravo 3 – "RAVEN"
 Spider-Man: Shattered Dimensions – Additional Voices
 Tangled: The Video Game – Additional Voices
 The Incredible Hulk – Additional Voices
 Tomb Raider: Anniversary – Larson Conway
 Tony Hawk's Pro Skater 2 – Additional Voices
 Tony Hawk's Pro Skater 3 – Additional Voices
 Tony Hawk's Pro Skater 4 – Additional Voices
 Too Human – Frey, Hanz, Wolf Trooper, Patron
 Transformers: Dark of the Moon – Mirage
 Ultimate Spider-Man – Additional Voices
 X-Men Origins: Wolverine – Additional Voices

Live action
 Versus - Suit (English dub, credited as Dave Levyland)
 The Do's and Don'ts of Cruising - Narrator

Other
 Cruising Do's and Dont's - Narrator
 I Didn't Know I Was Pregnant - Narrator
 Unbeatable Banzuke - Announcer (USA)
 Mystery ER - Narrator
 Ninja Warrior – Announcer (USA)
 WordGirl – Hosted (USA)

References

External links
 
 
 
 
 Dave Wittenberg, Dave Lelyveld at Crystal Acids Voice Actor Database
 

Living people
American male voice actors
American male video game actors
Year of birth missing (living people)
American people of Afrikaner descent
20th-century American male actors
21st-century American male actors